Mohamed Oukrif (born 14 August 1988) is an Algerian professional footballer. He currently plays as a defender.

Club career

Olympique de Médéa
Since his club's promotion to Ligue 2, due to the professionalisation of the league Oukrif was offered a new contract. He scored the equaliser on the 4 December 2010 against CA Batna, which in turn was his first goal of the 2010-11 season. He scored his second goal of the season against ES Mostaganem on 10 December 2010 in the seventy-sixth minute in a 4-2 thriller, with Olympique de Médéa	taking all three points.

On July 25, 2011, Oukrif signed a three year contract with MC Saïda.

Statistics

References

External links
 

1988 births
Living people
Algerian footballers
Algerian Ligue Professionnelle 1 players
Algerian Ligue 2 players
Association football defenders
Olympique de Médéa players
MC Saïda players
WA Tlemcen players
21st-century Algerian people